Harold de Andrado (30 December 1927 – 5 November 2004) was a Sri Lankan cricket writer and journalist.

He is a former student of St. Joseph's College, Colombo.

External links
Cricinfo obituary
Lankaweb obituary

Cricket historians and writers
Sri Lankan journalists
1927 births
2004 deaths
20th-century journalists